The river sandpaper fig (Ficus capreifolia) is a fig shrub or small tree of the western and eastern Afrotropics. It is typically found around pans or flood plains, or along riparian fringes in tropical or subtropical savanna regions, but is absent from the tropical rainforest zone.

The bark is pale and smooth, and the branches are slender. The elongate leaves are rough on both surfaces.

Gallery

References

External links

Trees of Africa